Gum-Gum is a township of Sandakan, Sabah, Malaysia. It is situated about 25 km from Sandakan town along Labuk Road. 

Sandakan